Jordan Hart (born 26 January 1995) is a Welsh badminton player. She was a Poland national badminton team member between 2021 and 26 September 2022. She made her international debut in 2009 Welsh International. She has won seven Welsh National Championships title, 5 times in the women's singles event from 2016 to 2020, once in the mixed and women's doubles in 2012 and 2020 respectively. 2019 was the golden year for Hart, where she achieved title wins in many international tournaments, some of them were in Jamaica, Giraldilla, Carebaco, Latvia and Polish International tournaments.

Achievements

BWF International Challenge/Series (5 titles, 4 runners-up) 
Women's singles

  BWF International Challenge tournament
  BWF International Series tournament
  BWF Future Series tournament

References

External links 

Living people
1995 births
Sportspeople from Haverfordwest
Welsh female badminton players
Welsh expatriate sportspeople in Poland
British emigrants to Poland
Naturalized citizens of Poland
Polish female badminton players